The 2016 Columbus Crew SC season was the club's twenty-first season of existence and their twenty-first consecutive season in Major League Soccer, the top flight of American soccer. Columbus also competed in the U.S. Open Cup and took part in the Desert Diamond Cup during preseason. The season covered the period from December 7, 2015 to the start of the 2017 Major League Soccer season.

Roster

Non-competitive

Preseason
On December 23, 2015, Columbus announced its preseason schedule for the 2016 season. Crew SC were to open preseason by traveling to Lakewood Ranch, Florida for a two-week camp, followed by a week-long camp in Powell, Ohio. Columbus would then travel to Arizona to compete in the 2016 Desert Diamond Cup, one of six Major League Soccer sides taking place in the tournament. Crew SC had scheduled matches against Sporting Kansas City, Real Salt Lake, and Swope Park Rangers, with an additional placement match to be determined after the conclusion of the scheduled matches.

Midseason

Competitive

MLS

Standings

Eastern Conference

Overall table

Results summary

Results by round

Match results

U.S. Open Cup

Statistics

Goals and assists

Disciplinary record

Transfers

In

SuperDraft

The following players were selected by Columbus in the MLS SuperDraft, but did not sign a contract with the club.

Loan in

Out

Loan out

Awards

MLS Team of the Week

MLS Player of the Week

MLS Player of the Month

Postseason
 MLS Team Fair Play award

Crew SC Team Awards
 Most Valuable Player – Justin Meram
 Golden Boot Winner – Ola Kamara
 Defender of the Year – Harrison Afful
 Humanitarian of the Year – Ethan Finlay
 Kirk Urso Heart Award – Hector Jiménez
 Academy Player of the Year – Devyn Etling

Kits

The away kit was based on the flag of Columbus.

See also
 Columbus Crew SC
 2016 in American soccer
 2016 Major League Soccer season

References

Notes

Columbus Crew seasons
Columbus Crew SC
Columbus Crew SC
Columbus Crew